William Russ (born October 20, 1950) is an American actor and television director. He played Alan Matthews on the sitcom Boy Meets World (1993–2000) and appeared in the television series Wiseguy, the soap operas Another World and The Young and the Restless and the feature films The Right Stuff (1983), Pastime (1990) and American History X (1998).

Career

Russ' acting first began on the New York stage before he embarked onto a television and film career. In 1977, he had his first supporting role in Death Bed: The Bed That Eats. This film would not be officially released until 2003.

During the 1980s, Russ found work in more supporting roles such as Crisis at Central High (1981), a television film also starring Academy Award winning actress Joanne Woodward, The Border (1981), The Right Stuff (1983) as Slick Goodlin, St. Elsewhere (1986) and Crime Story (1986).

He continued finding work in both television and film. He also guest-starred in the television series Miami Vice in the notable 1985 episode "Evan" as the title character, an ATF agent who shared a history with Don Johnson's character, Sonny Crockett. He made fourteen appearances on the 1987–1990 crime drama Wiseguy as Roger Lococco.

Russ received critical acclaim when he starred in Pastime (1991) as Roy Dean Bream, a veteran minor league hurler who mentors a young phenomenon. The role earned him a nomination at the 1992 Independent Spirit Awards for "Best Male Lead."

In 1993, he was cast as Alan Matthews on the television sitcom Boy Meets World. Russ played this role until the series ended in 2000. Russ also directed several episodes of the series during the last three seasons. His other television directing credits include directing one episode of both Lizzie McGuire and Rude Awakening.

However, he continued performing in other series and films throughout his time on Boy Meets World, primarily television films. In 1998, he performed as Danny and Derek Vinyard's father in the critically acclaimed American History X. Later, he starred in the short-lived television serial drama Mister Sterling.

In fall 2009, it was announced that Russ would be cast as the new character Tucker on The Young and the Restless. Russ' time on the show was short, however, as it has been announced the role of Tucker was being recast with Stephen Nichols replacing Russ in the role.

Russ is the star of the comedy web series Home at Last. In the series, he portrays "Bob", a homeless man who moves in with the son he abandoned at birth.

In 2014, Russ reprised his role of Alan Matthews from Boy Meets World on its spinoff Girl Meets World. In season 2, he joined the production crew, and directed one episode, being the only cast member to direct episodes of both Boy Meets World and Girl Meets World.

Filmography

Awards and nominations
Independent Spirit Awards
1992: Nominated, "Best Male Lead" – Pastime

References

External links

Home at Last

1950 births
American male film actors
American male stage actors
American male television actors
American television directors
Living people
Male actors from Virginia
People from Portsmouth, Virginia
University of Michigan alumni
20th-century American male actors
21st-century American male actors